In ancient Greece, Polymnestus was, with Phronime, the father of Battus I of Cyrene.

References

7th-century BC Greek people